Jacob Israël de Haan (31 December 1881 – 30 June 1924) was a Dutch Jewish literary writer, lawyer and journalist who immigrated to Palestine in 1919, and was assassinated in Jerusalem in 1924 by the Zionist paramilitary organization Haganah for his anti-Zionist political activities.

Early life
De Haan was born in Smilde, a village in the northern province of Drenthe, and grew up in Zaandam. He was said to be one of eighteen children and received a traditional Jewish education.

In 1904, while living in Amsterdam, he wrote the novel Pijpelijntjes ("Lines from De Pijp"), which pretends to be a thinly veiled version of his own gay life with Arnold Aletrino in Amsterdam's "Pijp" working-class district. The homo-eroticism of the book, shocking to readers in the early 20th century, led to his dismissal from his teaching job and social-democratic political circles. Aletrino and Johanna van Maarseveen, de Haan's fiancée, bought almost the entire print run of the book, to keep a lid on the scandal. In 1907, he married van Maarseveen, a non-Jewish doctor; they separated in 1919, but never officially divorced.

Work on behalf of Russian Jewish prisoners
In 1912, de Haan made some trips to Russia, and he visited a number of prisons there, in order to study the situation of political prisoners in Russia. He published his shocking findings in his book "In Russian prisons" (1913). He also founded a committee, together with Dutch writer Frederik van Eeden and Dutch poet Henriette Roland Holst, which aimed at collecting signatures for the sake of inducing especially Russia's then allies France and Great Britain to exert pressure on Russia to alleviate the fate of the prisoners. In a publication of Amnesty International he was, because of these activities, described as "a precursor of Amnesty International".

Move to Palestine

Zionist beginnings
Around 1910, De Haan developed an interest in the Land of Israel and Zionism. This seems to have begun as a result of his two-year activity on behalf of imprisoned Jews from Tsarist Russia, which made him deeply aware of the threats of anti-Semitism.

This is a description of de Haan prior to his departure for Palestine:

Religious and anti-Zionist phase
De Haan wrote extensively on the subject of Eretz Israel and Zionism even before he moved there in 1919, when he settled in Jerusalem, teaching at a new law school and sending articles to the Algemeen Handelsblad ("General Trade Journal"), one of the most important Dutch daily newspapers, and the De Groene Amsterdammer ("The Green Amsterdam Weekly"), a liberal weekly.

De Haan rapidly became more religiously committed. He was angered by Zionist refusals to cooperate with Arabs.

At first he aligned himself with religious Zionism and the Mizrachi movement, but after meeting Rabbi Yosef Chaim Sonnenfeld, leader of the ultra-conservative Haredi Jewish community, he became the political spokesman of the Haredim in Jerusalem and was elected political secretary of the Orthodox community council, Vaad Ha'ir. De Haan endeavoured to get an agreement with Arab nationalist leaders to allow unrestricted Jewish immigration into Palestine in exchange for a Jewish declaration forgoing the Balfour Declaration.

During this time it is alleged that he continued to have relationships with men, including Arabs from east Jerusalem. In one of his poems he asks himself whether his visits to the Wailing Wall were motivated by a desire for God or for the Arab boys there.

The secular Zionist establishment would not allow the established Haredi community in Palestine to be represented in the Jewish Agency in the 1920s . In response, the Haredim founded a branch of the Agudath Israel political organisation in Jerusalem to represent their interests in Mandate Palestine. The leader of the Haredi Jews in Palestine at the time, Rabbi Yosef Chaim Sonnenfeld, chose de Haan to organise and represent the Haredi position as their foreign minister, on a diplomatic level equal to that of the secular Zionists. When Lord Northcliffe, a British publisher, was about to visit the Middle East, de Haan went to Alexandria, Egypt to present the case of Palestine's Haredim before he reached Palestine:

De Haan, speaking on behalf of Agudath Israel, even opposed the British authorities allocating separate benefits to the Zionist-led Yishuv.

In August 1923, De Haan also met in Amman with the Hashemite leader Emir Hussein bin Ali, and his son, Emir Abdullah, the future king of independent Transjordan, seeking their support for the Old Yishuv (the pre-Zionist Jewish community in the Holy Land), explaining the Haredi Jewish opposition to the Zionist plans of founding a state, and supporting the establishment of an official Palestinian state within the Emirate of Transjordan as part of a federation. De Haan made plans to travel to London in July 1924, with an anti-Zionist Haredi delegation to argue against Zionism.

Assassination

As part of his anti-Zionist activity, De Haan was just about to leave for London when he was assassinated in Jerusalem by the Haganah on the early morning of 30 June 1924. As he exited the synagogue at the Shaare Zedek Hospital on Jaffa Road, Haganah member Avraham Tehomi, who was dressed in white, approached him and asked him for the time, then shot him three times and ran away from the scene. De Haan died minutes later.

At first, the Palestinian Jewish society, the Yishuv, readily accepted the theory that the assassination had to be blamed on Arabs, and didn't doubt the Zionist leadership's assurances that it had played no part in it. With time doubts started rising, until finally, in 1952, Yosef Hecht, the first commander of the main Jewish pre-state self-defense organisation, the Haganah, told the official Haganah historian in a testimony what had actually occurred. Hecht, in order to stop De Haan's activity in London, discussed the issue with Zechariah Urieli, the Haganah commander in Jerusalem, and the resulting decision was to assassinate him. Two Haganah members, Avraham Tehomi and Avraham Krichevsky, were selected for the task. Hecht only informed the Yishuv's civilian leadership after the assassination, by contacting Yitzhak Ben-Zvi, a senior member of the National Council. Hecht stated that "he did not regret it and would do it again." Previously to the facts being published, journalist Liel Leibovitz wrote that, while the identity of exactly who ordered the assassination was unknown, "there's little doubt that many in the senior Zionist leadership in Jerusalem knew about the proposal to kill de Haan—and that none objected."

The 1985 publication of De Haan: The first political assassination in Palestine, by Shlomo Nakdimon and Shaul Mayzlish, revived wider interest in his assassination.

Nakdimon and Mayzlish were able to trace Tehomi, then a businessman living in Hong Kong. Tehomi was interviewed for Israeli TV by Nakdimon and stated that Yitzhak Ben-Zvi, who later became the second President of Israel (1952-1963), must have ordered the assassination: "I have done what the Haganah decided had to be done. And nothing was done without the order of Yitzhak Ben-Zvi... I have no regrets because he (De Haan) wanted to destroy our whole idea of Zionism." Tehomi denied allegations that De Haan's assassination was related to his homosexuality: "I neither heard nor knew about this", adding "why is it someone's business what he does at his home?"

According to Gert Hekma, Zionists spread a rumour he had been killed by Arabs because of his sexual relations with Arab boys.

Aftermath and commemoration
De Haan was buried on the Mount of Olives. His funeral was attended by hundreds of Haredim, along with Zionist and British representatives. Following the funeral, many Haredim ventured into the city center to confront Zionists, and were barely restrained by the police.

The headquarters of Agudath Israel received condolences from the British Palestine government, the French and Spanish consuls in Jerusalem, and various cables from around the world. In New York, ultra-Orthodox Jews circulated Yiddish leaflets praising De Haan and condemning "Torahless Zionists, who use violence to enslave the pious." The British authorities offered a reward for information leading to the arrest of the killer, but Tehomi was never caught. A young pioneer named Yaakov Gussman was briefly detained by the British police on suspicion of carrying out the assassination, but released for lack of evidence.

The assassination caused shock in Palestine and Europe. Senior Zionist leaders, among them David Ben-Gurion, blamed each other. There was widespread speculation as to the identity of the assassin, with the theories postulated including him being a Zionist, a Haredi enraged over the revelations of De Haan's homosexuality, or an Arab lover.

De Haan's murder is considered the first political murder in the Jewish community in Palestine. His activities were perceived as undermining the struggle for the establishment of a Jewish state, but the assassination sparked a controversy and was harshly condemned by some. Labor movement publicist Moshe Beilinson wrote:

German author Arnold Zweig published a book in 1932 based on De Haan's life called "De Vriendt kehrt heim" (English title "De Vriendt Goes Home"). Israeli writer Haim Beer's book "Notzot" (1979, translated into English as Feathers) also has a character based on De Haan.

In Neturei Karta circles De Haan is considered a martyr, killed by secular Jews while protecting the Jewish religion; nevertheless, most Haredim recoil from his homosexuality, his religious questioning, and his attempted coalition with the Arab nationalists against his fellow Jews. During the 1980s, the Neturei Karta community in Jerusalem tried to change the name of the Zupnik Garden to commemorate De Haan.

Netherlands 

Although De Haan's fame waned after his death, his works have been published and reprinted. Even under the Nazi occupation of the Netherlands, David Koker managed to publish his Brieven uit Jeruzalem ('Letters from Jerusalem') in a little book. In 1949, a committee was founded with the object to publish a collected edition of the poems, which followed in 1952. A 'Society Jacob Israël de Haan' furthered other publications: philosophical aphorisms and letters, and a memoir by his sister Mies de Haan. In the 1960s two attempts at a biography were published, and after 1970 an actual De Haan-revival brought with it publicity. Many of his publications about law and significs have been reprinted, as were his novels, and his earlier prose has been rescued from obscure magazines. Dozens of bibliophile editions honoured his poems and prose sketches. Many magazine articles and other publications about his life were published, and generated heated debates. A large volume of his correspondence (only of the period 1902–1908), published in 1994, shed a bright light on his life, but a full-scale biography has yet to be written.

Through the years, in the Netherlands there have been projects, festivals and theatre productions commemorating Jacob Israël de Haan's work and life. A line from De Haan's poem "To a Young Fisherman": "For friendship such a limitless longing...", is inscribed on one of the three sides of the Homomonument in Amsterdam.

Publications

Poetry
 1900–1908 De Haan published poetry in several magazines during these years. These early poems however have never been collected in a book
 1914 – Libertijnsche liederen ('Libertine songs')
 1915 – Het Joodsche lied. Eerste boek ('Jewish song, first book')
 1917 – Liederen ('Songs')
 1919 – Een nieuw Carthago ('A new Carthage', Carthage being a metaphor for Antwerp in this case)
 1921 – Het Joodsche lied. Tweede boek ('Jewish song, second book')
 1924 – Kwatrijnen ('Quatrains')
 1952 – Verzamelde gedichten ('Collected poems'); complete poetry 1909–1924 in two volumes, edited by K. Lekkerkerker
 1982 – Ik ben een jongen te Zaandam geweest ('I was a boy in Zaandam'), anthology edited by Gerrit Komrij

Prose
 1904 – Pijpelijntjes (last reprint 2006)
 1904 – Kanalje ('Rabble'; reprint 1977)
 1907 – Ondergangen ('Perditions'; reprint 1984)
 1905–1910 - Nerveuze vertellingen ('Nervous Tales', published in various magazines, first collected in 1983)
 1907–1910 - Besliste volzinnen ('Decided Sentences', aphorisms published in magazines, collected for the first time in 1954)
 1908 – Pathologieën. De ondergang van Johan van Vere de With ('Pathologies. The Perdition of Johan van Vere de With'; last reprint 2003)

Law
 1916 – Wezen en taak der rechtskundige significa. Inaugural address
 1916 – Rechtskundige significa en hare toepassing op de begrippen: 'aansprakelĳk, verantwoordelĳk, toerekeningsvatbaar (dissertatie)
 1919 – Rechtskundige significa

Journalism
 1913 – In Russische gevangenissen ('In Russian Prisons')
 From Palestine De Haan sent many sketches and articles to the Dutch newspaper Algemeen Handelsblad. These never have been completely published in book form, but there are several collections:
 1922 – Jeruzalem
 1925 – Palestina with an introduction by Carry van Bruggen
 1941 – Brieven uit Jeruzalem edited by David Koker ('Letters from Jerusalem')
 1981 – Jacob Israël de Haan - correspondent in Palestina, 1919-1924. Collected and edited by Ludy Giebels

Correspondence
 1994 – Brieven van en aan Jacob Israël de Haan 1899-1908. Edited by Rob Delvigne and Leo Ross

See also

 Edah HaChareidis
 Haim Arlosoroff
 History of the Jews in the Netherlands
 Notable Dutch Jews
 Zionist political violence

Notes

External links

 Archive  (Amsterdam University)
 HAAN, JACOB ISRAËL by Henriette Boas and Ludy Giebels. Encyclopaedia Judaica article at Encyclopedia.com 
 On De Haan by Ludy Giebels
 Amsterdam Jewish History Museum biography (Dutch)
 links to de Haan's writings
 Images of de Haan
 
 

1881 births
1924 deaths
20th-century Dutch novelists
Anti-Zionist Jews
Assassinated Jews
Assassinated Dutch journalists
Baalei teshuva
Burials at the Jewish cemetery on the Mount of Olives
Belgian male novelists
Dutch Jews
Dutch Orthodox Jews
Dutch people murdered abroad
Dutch male poets
Dutch gay writers
Jewish anti-Zionism in Mandatory Palestine
Orthodox Jewish socialists
Orthodox Jews in Mandatory Palestine
LGBT Orthodox Jews
Gay Jews
Dutch LGBT journalists
Dutch LGBT novelists
Dutch LGBT poets
LGBT history in the Netherlands
Gay journalists
Gay novelists
Gay poets
People from Midden-Drenthe
Yishuv journalists
20th-century Dutch poets
20th-century Dutch male writers
Dutch murder victims
Dutch male novelists
20th-century Dutch journalists